Favian (also Romanized as Fāvīān, Fāveyān, and Fāvīyān) is a village in Jolgeh Rural District, in the Central District of Golpayegan County, Isfahan Province, Iran. At the 2006 census, its population was 492, in 165 families.

References 

Populated places in Golpayegan County